James Grant O'Hara (November 8, 1925 – March 13, 1989) was a soldier and politician from the U.S. state of Michigan, serving as U.S. Representative from 1959 to 1977.

Early life

O'Hara was born in Washington, D.C. He moved with his parents to Michigan in 1939 and graduated from University of Detroit High School in 1943. During the Second World War, he served as an enlisted man in the United States Army with Company B, 511th Parachute Infantry Regiment, U.S. 11th Airborne Division, seeing action in the Pacific Theater of Operations.

After the war, O'Hara graduated from the University of Michigan in 1954 and from the law department of the same university in 1955. He was admitted to the bar in 1955 and commenced the practice of law in Detroit and Macomb County. He was a delegate to the Democratic National Conventions in 1960 and 1968.

Political career

In 1958, he defeated incumbent Republican Robert J. McIntosh to be elected as a Democrat to the 86th United States Congress. He was subsequently re-elected to the eight succeeding Congresses, serving from January 3, 1959 to January 3, 1977. He represented Michigan's 7th congressional district from 1959 to 1965 and after redistricting due to the 1960 census, he represented Michigan's 12th congressional district from 1965 to 1977. Both districts were part of the Metro Detroit area.

O'Hara was not a candidate for reelection in 1976, but instead chose to run for a seat in the United States Senate, after Philip Hart chose not to seek re-election. O'Hara lost in the Democratic primary election to Republican-turned-Democratic Representative Donald W. Riegle Jr. of Flint, who went on to win in the general election.  O'Hara resumed the practice of law in Washington, D.C. He was a member, and later chairman, Federal Minimum Wage Study Commission, 1978–1981.

Biography

James O'Hara was a Democratic congressman from the 7th and 12th districts of Michigan from 1959 to 1976. As a member of the Education and Labor Committee O'Hara was involved in shaping much of the major labor and education legislation enacted during the period. He came to be regarded as one of the principal spokesmen for organized labor in the House and was recognized as an expert on House rules and legislative tactics. O'Hara was an active participant in reform movements within the House and in the national Democratic Party. He was a founding member of the House Democratic Study Group and chaired the Democratic National Committee's Commission on Rules, 1969–1972. O'Hara gave up his seat in the House of Representatives to run for the United States Senate in 1976.

James Grant O'Hara was born November 8, 1925 in Washington, DC. His family moved to Detroit when he was fourteen and O'Hara graduated from Detroit University High School in 1943. O'Hara then enlisted in the Army, serving with Company B, 511th Parachute Infantry Regiment of the 11th Airborne Division. He saw combat action as a paratrooper in the Pacific theater. After his discharge from the army in April 1946, O'Hara enrolled in the University of Michigan. He received his bachelor's degree in 1954 and a law degree in 1955. O'Hara married Susan Puskas in 1953 and is the father of seven children. From 1955 to 1958 O'Hara practiced law in Detroit.

O'Hara made his first bid for elective office in 1958. He secured the Democratic Party nomination for Congress from the 7th district by winning a narrow victory in the primary election. O'Hara then won the general election in the traditionally Republican district by a margin of 2768 votes. O'Hara was reelected in 1960 by a margin of 18,000 votes. Thereafter his electoral victories were generally by margins of two or three to one. The sole exception was the 1972 campaign when the effects of redistricting, a weak Democratic national ticket, and the divisive busing issue resulted in a victory margin of fewer than 3,000 votes.

The 7th congressional district, which O'Hara represented from 1959 to 1962, consisted of Macomb, Huron, Lapeer, St. Clair, Sanilac and Tuscola counties. In the redistricting of 1962, a new 12th district was created, consisting of Macomb County and a small part of Wayne County. O'Hara elected to establish his residence in the 12th district and represented the area from 1963 to 1976. The 12th district was enlarged in 1972 to include all of Macomb County except Sterling Heights and part of Warren City, St. Clair County, Avon township in Oakland County, and Buell, Fremont, and Worth townships in Sanilac County.

In his freshman term, O'Hara was assigned to the Education and Labor Committee and played a significant role in the attempts to soften the anti-labor features of the Landrum-Griffin bill. He served on the Education and Labor Committee for his entire congressional career, eventually becoming one of the ranking Democratic members. He chaired a special subcommittee on migrant labor, 1971–1972, and the Special Subcommittee on Higher Education, 1973–1976. As chair of the latter subcommittee, O'Hara received national attention for his work on revisions to student financial assistance programs and the control of college tuition costs.

O'Hara also served on the Committee on Interior and Insular Affairs, from 1967 to 1974, and on the Joint Committee on Congressional Operations, from 1973 to 1974. In 1973 O'Hara was appointed to the special "Hansen Committee" on a proposed reorganization of the House. Among its other recommendations, the Hansen Committee called for the creation of a House Budget Committee and the establishment of the Congressional Budget Office. In the 94th Congress O'Hara gave up his seat on the Interior and Insular Affairs Committee to accept a position on the new Budget Committee.

During his second term in Congress, O'Hara was elected to serve as regional Democratic whip for Michigan, Wisconsin, and Minnesota. He held that position throughout his career and came to be recognized as one of the Democrat's most skilled floor leaders and legislative strategists. O'Hara was one of the leaders of the group of younger, generally liberal congressmen who led the fight to revive and reform the House Democratic caucus and to challenge the absolute authority of committee chairmen under the seniority system. In 1971 O'Hara waged an unsuccessful campaign for majority leader of the House.

A founding member of the Democratic Study Group in 1959, O'Hara served as vice chairman of the liberal reform group in 1965–1966 and as chairman in 1967–1968. O'Hara also participated in the Conference of Great Lakes Congressmen and was elected to succeed John Blatnik as chairman of the group in the 94th Congress.

O'Hara served on a number of national Democratic Party committees and commissions. He was frequently a delegate to the party's national convention and served on the credentials committee of the 1968 convention. After the disruptions of the 1968 convention, O'Hara was appointed by the Democratic National Committee to head a Commission on Party Rules. The Commission, which held hearings and meetings from 1969 to 1972, was charged with making recommendations for the rules and procedures for the 1972 Democratic convention. O'Hara was chairman of the 1972 Convention Rules Committee and also acted as parliamentarian for the convention.

Following the 1972 convention, O'Hara was appointed to the Democratic Party Charter Commission headed by Terry Sanford. He was also a member of the Commission on the Selection of Vice Presidential Candidates. Though not a member of the Mikulski Commission on Delegate Selection, O'Hara worked closely with it and later served on the Compliance Review Commission charged with enforcing the Mikulski Commission's delegate selection guidelines for the 1976 party convention.

O'Hara was a charter member and national co-chairman of the Coalition for a Democratic Majority. This organization of "regular Democrats" was formed in the aftermath of the landslide defeat the Democratic party suffered in 1972. It was opposed to the "new politics" represented by the McGovern faction of the party and sought to revise the reforms instituted after the 1968 convention.

In 1976 O'Hara sought the Democratic Party nomination for United States senator to succeed the retiring Phil Hart. O'Hara lost the primary election to Donald Riegle and Richard Austin. After finishing out his term in the 94th Congress, O'Hara returned to the practice of law. He died on March 13, 1989.

Personal life

O'Hara was a resident of Hollin Hills near Alexandria, Virginia, until his death at age 63 from lung cancer at the George Washington University Medical Center in Washington. He is interred in Arlington National Cemetery.

References

 The Political Graveyard
 Bentley Historical Library – James G. O'Hara papers: 1958–1987 (bulk 1958–1976) (University of Michigan)

|-

1925 births
1989 deaths
20th-century American politicians
United States Army personnel of World War II
Burials at Arlington National Cemetery
Deaths from lung cancer
Democratic Party members of the United States House of Representatives from Michigan
Michigan lawyers
United States Army soldiers
University of Detroit Jesuit High School and Academy alumni
University of Michigan Law School alumni
20th-century American lawyers